Mattia Minesso (born 30 March 1990) is an Italian professional footballer who plays as a forward for  club Triestina.

Club career

Vicenza
Born in Cittadella, Veneto, Minesso started his career at Vicenza. Minesso made his Serie B debut on 10 May 2008, replacing winger Davide Matteini in the second half. In that match, Vicenza won Frosinone 2–1. Minesso also played for Vicenza's Primavera under-20 team from 2007 to 2010 after promoted from its Allievi Nazionali under-17 team. Minesso failed to play any game for the first team in 2009–10 Serie B but also only played 4 times for Primavera that season.

Chievo & Andria
On 24 June 2010, five days before the closure of 2009–10 financial year of "A.C. Chievo-Verona s.r.l." and "Vicenza Calcio S.p.A.", Minesso joined Serie A club Chievo, while Amedeo Benedetti joined the opposite side. Both players were "valued" for €2 million (thus no cash involved). Co-currently both clubs bought back 50% registration rights for €1M as part of co-ownership deal. As youth product usually did not have a value as "intangible asset" (because it was based on historical cost, such as acquire cost, agent fee and training cost), both clubs had a selling profit (but partially offset by VAT and created amortize cost in next few years) On 30 June 2010, Chievo had a positive shareholder equity of €687,180, thus no need to recapitalisation (The club did re-capitalised for €250,000 in 2010–11 financial year). However, Minesso was part of the "intangible asset" of Chievo which "worth" €2 million at that time, plus Daniele Rosania "worth" €1 million. Vicenza also swapped players with Ascoli and Cesena before the closure of the financial year.

Minesso did not remain in Verona, another city of Veneto. Instead Minesso immediately returned to the city of Vicenza (likes Giacomo Tulli who already "sold" to Cesena) but Minesso only made 5 league appearances in 2010–11 Serie B, as number 9 of the team.

On 7 January 2011, Minesso joined Lega Pro Prima Divisione club Andria, re-joining team-mate Mattia Evangelisti. (Italian third division) Minesso played 14 times in 2010–11 Lega Pro Prima Divisione, but only 8 starts.

Vicenza return
In June 2011 both Benedetti and Minesso returned to their mother clubs for the same price (50% rights for €1 million). Again, Chievo had a positive equity of €679,516 and player asset of €20,156,304, but composited with players such as Benedetti (€2M) and Alessandro Bassoli (€3 million, recently joined from Bologna) On Vicenza side, the club also swapped Tonelli with Cesena before the closure of 2010–11 financial year.

As Minesso had a "value" of €2 million in accounting, Vicenza failed to find a new club to buy him (or it may have had to write-down the inflated value). Instead Minesso's loan was renewed on 16 July 2011

After Vicenza relegated, Minesso returned to the club and took part in pre-season. He was confirmed as part of the squad despite Vicenza was re-admitted to 2012–13 Serie B on 23 August after the expel of Lecce. He wore no.15 shirt.

Cittadella
On 25 January 2013, Minesso left for another Veneto and Serie B club Cittadella, which Tommaso Bellazzini moved to opposite direction. On 1 July 2013 Cittadella signed Minesso outright.

Bassano
On 6 July 2016, he was signed by Bassano Virtus for an undisclosed fee.

Padova
In June 2018 Minesso was signed by Serie B club Padova as a free agent.

Pisa
On 14 January 2019, he signed with Pisa.

Perugia
On 5 October 2020, he joined Perugia on loan with a conditional obligation to buy.

Modena
On 9 July 2021, he joined Modena on loan with a conditional obligation to buy. He made his debut on 29 August, the first matchday of the domestic season, in a 0–0 draw against Grosseto, coming on as a substitute for Roberto Ogunseye in the second half. He scored his first goal for the club on 19 September in a 4–0 away win over Fermana. He scored again the following week as Modena lost 2–1 to Virtus Entella at home, to bring his goal tally to 2 in 3 games.

Triestina
On 24 August 2022, Minesso signed a two-year contract with Triestina.

Honours

Club 
Cittadella
 Lega Pro: 2015–16 Group A

Perugia
 Serie C: 2020–21 Group B

References

External links
 Football.it Profile  
 Lega Serie B Profile 
 Andria Profile 
 
 

1990 births
Living people
People from Cittadella
Footballers from Veneto
Italian footballers
Association football wingers
Serie B players
Serie C players
L.R. Vicenza players
S.S. Fidelis Andria 1928 players
A.S. Cittadella players
F.C. Südtirol players
Bassano Virtus 55 S.T. players
Calcio Padova players
Pisa S.C. players
A.C. Perugia Calcio players
Modena F.C. 2018 players
U.S. Triestina Calcio 1918 players
Sportspeople from the Province of Padua